Koksofen is the fourth album by Caspar Brötzmann Massaker, released in June 1993 through Our Choice.

Track listing

Accolades

Personnel 
Musicians
Caspar Brötzmann – guitar, vocals, production, cover art, design
Eduardo Delgado-Lopez – bass guitar
Danny Arnold Lommen – drums
Production and additional personnel
Peter Brötzmann – design
Bruno Gebhard – production, recording
Ingo Krauss – production, recording
Dirk Rudolph – design

References

External links 
 

1993 albums
Caspar Brötzmann albums